Longneck can refer to:

 "Longneck Bottle", a song written by Steve Wariner and Rick Carnes
 Longneck eel
 Long Neck, Delaware, United States
 a design of beer bottle
 a term for Apatosaurus or similarly structured dinosaurs

See also
 Long Neck Karen, or Kayan people of Myanmar
 Longnecker, a surname